The 1978 Lagos Classic was a men's tennis tournament played on outdoor hard courts at the Lagos Lawn Tennis Club in Lagos, Nigeria. The event was part of the World Championship Tennis tier of the 1978 Grand Prix circuit. It was the second edition of the tournament and was held from 27 February until 5 March 1978. Third-seeded Kjell Johansson won the singles title.

Finals

Singles
 Kjell Johansson defeated  Robin Drysdale, 9–8, 6–3
 It was Johansson's only singles title of his career.

Doubles
 Sashi Menon /  George Hardie defeated  Colin Dowdeswell /  Jürgen Fassbender 6–3, 3–6, 7–5

References

External links
 ITF tournament edition details

Lagos Classic
1978 in Nigerian sport
Tennis tournaments in Nigeria
International sports competitions in Lagos
20th century in Lagos